Multiple symbols have been developed to represent vegetarianism and veganism. Several are used on food packaging, including voluntary labels such as the Vegan Society trademark or the V-Label (with support of the European Vegetarian Union) as well as the vegetarian and non-vegetarian marks mandated by the Indian government. Symbols may also be used by members of the vegetarian and vegan communities to represent their identities, and in the course of animal rights activism.

Vegetarian symbols

Indian vegetarian mark

Packaged food and toothpaste products sold in India are required to be labelled with a mandatory mark in order to be distinguished between lacto-vegetarian and non-vegetarian. The symbol is in effect following the Food Safety and Standards (Packaging and Labelling) Act of 2006, and received a mandatory status after the framing of the respective regulations (Food Safety and Standards (Packaging and Labelling) Regulation) in 2011. According to the law, vegetarian food should be identified by a green symbol and non-vegetarian food with a brown symbol. They are defined as:

"Vegetarian food must have a symbol of a green color-filled circle inside a square with a green outline prominently displayed on the package, contrasting against the background on the principal display panel, in close proximity to name or brand name of the food."

"Non-vegetarian food (any food which contains whole or part of any animal including birds, marine animals, eggs, or products of any animal origin as an ingredient, excluding honey, milk or milk products), must have a symbol of a brown color-filled circle inside a square with a brown outline prominently displayed on the package, contrasting against the background on the principal display panel, in close proximity to the name or brand name of the food."

In 2021, FSSAI (Food Safety and Standards Authority of India) adopted a new symbol for non-vegetarian food items due to concerns that the combination of the old symbols were difficult for people with colour blindness to distinguish. The new symbol is that of a brown color-filled triangle inside a square with a brown outline.

In September 2021, the FSSAI announced adoption of the new vegan symbol.

V-Label

The V-Label, a V with a leaf, originated with the European Vegetarian Union. The V-Label is a standardised international vegan and vegetarian label supported by the EVU with the aim of easy identification of vegan and vegetarian products and services.

Vegan symbols

Vegan Trademark

The Vegan Trademark, with its iconic sunflower, is an internationally recognised standard from The Vegan Society (who coined the term 'vegan'). It certifies products with the aim of easy identification of vegan products. Launched in 1990, it was the first vegan verification scheme.

Enclosed V

The enclosed v (modeled after the enclosed A symbol) is a popular vegan symbol, especially on social networks where it is represented by the Ⓥ symbol of the Enclosed Alphanumerics Unicode block. This lowercase "V" inside a circle is not used to label products as vegan nor should be relied upon to determine if a product is vegan. A kosher organization (Vaad Hoeir of St. Louis) owns and uses a US trademark (certification mark) consisting of an uppercase V inside a circle.

Seedling emoji
On internet forums and social networks, the seedling emoji 🌱 is sometimes used to symbolize veganism or vegan products.

Veganarchy symbol

The Veganarchy symbol, first introduced in print in Brian A. Dominick's Animal Liberation and Social Revolution pamphlet in 1995, combines the Circle-V with the Circle-A of anarchist symbolism.

Vegan flag 

The vegan flag was designed by a network group of graphic designers and activists from several countries. The group was opened by Gad Hakimi, a vegan activist and designer from Israel. who intended it to be a civil flag to represent veganism. The flag consists of three blue and green triangles forming the letter V, the first letter in the word "vegan".

Originally, some members of the group suggested that animals should be featured on the flag, with red colours featuring prominently to symbolize the blood of slaughtered animals. However, the group eventually chose to make the flag about human–animal equality, not about animals themselves. 
Inspired by the LGBT rainbow flag, the flag was created in hopes of uniting animal rights organizations and activists.
The colours white, green, and blue were chosen to represent the natural habitats of animals: sky, land, and sea. The letter V stands for Vegan, and is an inverted pyramid intended to symbolize the ability to do the impossible.

V-Label

The international V-Label supported by the European Vegetarian Union is an internationally recognised and protected trademark for the labelling of vegetarian and vegan products.

Gallery

See also
 List of food labeling regulations
 Food Safety and Standards Authority of India

References

External links
 The Food Safety and Standards Authority of India

Lists of symbols
Vegetarianism
Veganism
Political symbols